Glyceroneogenesis is a metabolic pathway which synthesizes glycerol 3-phosphate or triglyceride from precursors other than glucose. Usually glycerol 3-phosphate is generated from glucose by glycolysis, but when glucose concentration drops in the cytosol, it is generated by another pathway called glyceroneogenesis. Glyceroneogenesis uses pyruvate, alanine, glutamine or any substances from the TCA cycle as precursors for glycerol 3-phosphate. Phosphoenolpyruvate carboxykinase (PEPC-K), which is an enzyme that catalyzes the decarboxylation of oxaloacetate to phosphoenolpyruvate is the main regulator for this pathway. Glyceroneogenesis can be observed in adipose tissue and also in the liver. It is a significant biochemical pathway that regulates cytosolic lipid levels. Intense suppression of glyceroneogenesis may lead to metabolic disorders such as type 2 diabetes.

Summary
In mammals, triglycerol or its backbone, glycerol 3-phosphate, is usually synthesized from glucose through glycolysis. Glucose will be degraded though glycolysis until fructose 1,6-bisphosphate is broken down to dihydroxyacetone phosphate, which can be used to generate glycerol 3-phosphate, and glyceraldehyde 3-phosphate. However, when an organism is deficient in carbohydrates such as glucose, such as during fasting or on a low-carbohydrate diet, glycerol 3-phosphate is generated by glyceroneogenesis. As well as synthesizing lipids for use in other metabolic processes, glyceroneogenesis regulates lipid levels in the cytosol, as it involves re-esterification of fatty acids to generate triglycerides.

Metabolic pathway

The main precursors of glyceroneogenesis are pyruvate, lactate, glutamine, and alanine. Glyceroneogenesis is also known as the branched pathway of gluconeogenesis because the first few steps in glyceroneogenesis are exactly the same as gluconeogenesis.

When pyruvate or lactate is used as the precursor for glycerol 3-phosphate, glyceroneogenesis follows exactly the same pathway as gluconeogenesis until it generates dihydroxyacetone phosphate. Lactate catalysed by lactate dehydrogenase will form pyruvate at the expense of NAD+. Furthermore, by using 1 ATP and bicarbonate, pyruvate will be converted to oxaloacetate. which is catalysed by pyruvate carboxylase. Oxaloacetate will be catalysed by PEPC-K to generate phosphoenolpyruvate. This phosphorylation and decarboxylation of oxaloacetate is a significant step in glyceroneogenesis because the entire pathway is regulated by this reaction. After the production of phosphoenolpyruvate, gluconeogenesis will continue until dihydroxyacetone phosphate is generated, which produces 2-phosphoglycerate, 3-phosphoglycerate, 1,3-bisphosphoglycerate and glyceraldehyde 3-phosphate as intermediates. When dihydroxyacetone phosphate is produced, glyceroneogenesis will branch off from gluconeogenesis. With expense of NADH, dihydroxyacetone phosphate will convert to glycerol 3- phosphate (Figure 4), which is the final product of glyceroneogenesis. In addition, triglyceride can be generated by the re-esterification of 3 fatty acid chains on glycerol 3-phosphate.  Therefore, glyceroneogenesis is a metabolic pathway starting from lactate or pyruvate, and it is similar to gluconeogenesis but the pathway will branch out when dihydroxyacetone phosphate is generated. Instead of producing fructose 1,6- bisphosphate as gluconeogenesis does, glyceroneogenesis converts dihydroxyacetone phosphate to glycerol 3-phosphate.

Alanine can also be used as a precursor of glyceroneogenesis because alanine can be degraded to pyruvate. Alanine will degrade to pyruvate by transferring its amino group to 2-oxoglutarate with an enzyme called alanine aminotransferase. Alanine aminotransferase will cleave off the amino group from alanine and binds it to 2-oxoglutarate which generates pyruvate from alanine and glutamate from 2-oxoglutarate. Pyruvate generated from alanine will enter glyceroneogenesis and generate glycerol 3-phosphate.

Glutamate is also a known metabolite substance that can enter glyceroneogenesis. Since the key reaction of glyceroneogenesis is the decarboxylation and phosphorylation of oxaloacetate to phosphoenolpyruvate, in theory, any biochemical pathway which generates oxaloacetate is related to glyceroneogenesis. For example, glutamate can generate oxaloacetate in 2 steps. First of all, glutamate can be converted to 2-oxoglutarate with the expense of NAD+ and H2O with help of glutamate dehydrogenase. Secondly, 2-oxoglutarate can enter the tricarboxylic acid cycle in order to generate oxaloacetate. Therefore, theoretically any metabolites in the TCA cycle or any metabolites generating the metabolites of the TCA cycle can be used as a precursor of glyceroneogenesis, but glutamate is the only precursor confirmed,

Regulation

Phosphoenolpyruvate carboxykinase (PEPC-K) 
Glyceroneogenesis can be regulated at two reaction pathways. First of all, it can be regulated at the decarboxylation of oxaloacetate to phosphoenolpyruvate. Secondly, the TCA cycle can affect glyceroneogenesis when the glutamate or substrates in the TCA cycle are being used as a precursor. 
Decarboxylation of oxaloacetate to phosphoenolpyruvate is catalyzed by PEPC-K, the essential enzyme which regulates glyceroneogenesis. Increases in PEPC-K levels or overexpression of the gene that codes for PEPC-K will increase glyceroneogenesis. Also, oxaloacetate can be decarboxylated to phosphoenolpyruvate when there is more PEPC-K that can catalyze the reaction. Furthermore, gene expression of PEPC-K can be suppressed by norepinephrine, glucocorticoids, and insulin. Norepinephrine is a neurotransmitter which decreases the activity of PEPC-K when the cell is in a cold environment. Glucocorticoids are steroid hormones which are involved in the reciprocal regulation of glyceroneogenesis in the liver and adipose tissues. The actual mechanism is not well understood, but glucocorticoids induce transcription of PEPC-K in the liver while decreasing transcription in adipose tissues. Insulin is a peptide hormone that induces cells to take in glucose. Through glyceroneogenesis, insulin downregulates the expression of PEPC-K in both liver and adipose tissues.

TCA cycle 
When metabolites from the TCA cycle or glutamate are used as a precursor for glyceroneogenesis, the regulator in the TCA cycle can also cause fluctuations in the levels of products formed by glyceroneogenesis. Regulation of the TCA cycle is mostly determined by product inhibition and substrate availability. TCA cycle will slow down when excess product is present in the environment or deficient of the substrate such as ADP and NAD+

Location
Since glyceroneogenesis is related to lipid regulation, it can be found in adipose tissue and the liver. In adipose tissue, glyceroneogenesis restrains the release of free fatty acids by re-esterifying them and in the liver, triglycerides are synthesized for lipid distribution.

White adipose tissue 
White adipose tissue, also known as white fat, is one of the 2 types of adipose tissue in mammals. White adipose tissue stores energy in form of triglycerides that can be broken down to free fatty acids. Its normal function is to store free fatty acids as triglycerides within the tissue. However, when the glucose level of in the cell drops in situations like fasting, white adipose tissue generates glycerol 3-phosphate.

Brown adipose tissue 
Brown adipose tissue is another type of adipose tissue which stores free fatty acids. Brown adipose tissue is especially abundant in newborn and hibernating mammals. The main differences between brown and white adipose tissue are that brown adipose tissues have higher activity in glyceroneogenesis than white adipose tissues and that glyceroneogenesis in brown adipose tissue is related to thermogenesis. The activity of glyceroneogenesis in brown adipose tissue is greater than that of white adipose tissue because it contains more enzymes involved in glyceroneogenesis. Compared to white adipose tissue, brown adipose tissue has a considerably higher activity of PEPC-K and glycerol kinase. The activity of PEPC-K in brown adipose tissue is almost 10 times the activity of that in white adipose tissue.  PEPC-K, which is involved in the conversion of oxaloacetate to phosphoenolpyruvate, is the key enzyme that regulates glyceroneogenesis. An increase in the activity of the enzyme will increase the activity of the pathway. Furthermore, not only PEPC-K but brown adipose tissue is also rich in the activity of glycerol kinase. Glycerol kinase is the enzyme which phosphorylates glycerol in order to generate the backbone of triglycerides, glycerol 3-phosphate. An increase in the activity of glycerol kinase will result in an increase in the production of glycerol 3- phosphate. As a result, brown adipose tissue will have greater activity in glyceroneogenesis, because it contains more enzymes involved in the pathway.

In addition, glyceroneogenesis in brown adipose tissue is related to thermogenesis in the organism. In mammals, heat is generated by delivering free fatty acids to the mitochondria. When glyceroneogenesis is proceeding regularly, the concentration of free fatty acid is low in the intracellular environment because glyceroneogenesis re-esterifies fatty acids to triglycerides. In other words, thermogenesis by free fatty acids is less likely to occur when glyceroneogenesis is proceeding. However, when exposed to cold, a neurotransmitter hormone called norepinephrine suppresses the activity of PEPC-K. When the activity of PEPC-K is suppressed, glyceroneogenesis will be unable to re-esterify the free fatty acids. Eventually, the free fatty acid concentration within the cell will increase leading to excessive free fatty acids in the cytosol, which will consequently be delivered to the mitochondria for thermogenesis. Therefore, when a mammal is exposed to cold, heat is generated in the brown adipose tissue by decreasing the activity of glyceroneogenesis.

Liver 
Although glyceroneogenesis was first found in adipose tissues, it was not recognized in the liver until 1998.  This finding was unexpected because triglyceride synthesis in the liver was thought not to occur due to the amount of gluconeogenesis taking place in the liver, and because the liver was believed to have sufficient glycerol 3-phosphate collected from the bloodstream. However, several experiments, which used stable isotopes to track the glycerol in the liver and bloodstream, showed that 65% of the glycerol backbone of triglycerides in the bloodstream is actually synthesized in the liver. In fact, the liver synthesizes more than half of the glycerol mammals need to regulate lipids in their body.

Glyceroneogenesis in the liver and adipose tissues regulate lipid metabolism in opposite ways. On the one hand, lipids in the form of triglycerides are released from the liver. However, on the other hand, glyceroneogenesis restrains the fatty acid release from adipose tissues by re-esterifying them. In other words, glyceroneogenesis in the liver and adipose tissues are alternately regulated. When the lipid concentration in the blood is relatively high, glyceroneogenesis in the liver will negatively be regulated to stop the synthesis of triglyceride, but glyceroneogenesis in adipose tissues will be induced in order to restrain the release of free fatty acid to the bloodstream. Conversely, glyceroneogenesis in the liver will be induced and suppressed in adipose tissues when the lipid level of the blood is low. Even though the reciprocal regulation of glyceroneogenesis is not well understood, a hormone called glucocorticoid is the best example of the regulation. Glucocorticoids induce gene transcription of PEPC-K in liver but repress the transcription in adipose tissues.

Disease

Type 2 Diabetes 
Failure in regulating glyceroneogenesis may lead to Type 2 diabetes. Type 2 diabetes is a metabolic disorder that results in high levels of blood glucose and blood lipid. Type2 diabetes is associated with the overproduction of triglycerides in the liver due to excessively active glyceroneogenesis and excess release of fatty acids from adipose tissues. Since the activity of glyceroneogenesis is mostly dependent on PEPC-K, fluctuating the expressions for PEPC-K will dramatically influence the activity of glyceroneogenesis. Overexpressing PEPC-K in the liver will eventually result in the overproduction of triglycerides, which can elevate the lipid level in the bloodstream. Conversely, in adipose tissue, downregulated glyceroneogenesis may decrease de novo lipogenesis.  Suppressed glyceroneogenesis will result in the increase of free fatty acids in the adipose tissues and its subsequent export to the bloodstream because the re-esterification of free fatty acids into triglycerides will decrease due to the decreased availability of the glycerol backbone. Therefore, glyceroneogenesis overly induced in the liver and reduced in adipose tissues can lead, respectively, to hepatic steatosis and lipodystrophy, both highly associated with type 2 Diabetes.

Treatment 
Regulation of glyceroneogenesis is a therapeutic target of type 2 diabetes treatment. The release of triglycerides in the liver should be inhibited as well as the release of free fatty acid in adipose tissues. Insulin is used as a down regulator in the liver of glyceroneogenesis. Suppression in glyceroneogenesis will decrease the triglyceride being released into the bloodstream from the liver. However, the problem with insulin is that it also suppresses glyceroneogenesis in adipose tissue. In order to restrict the release of free fatty acid from adipose tissues, fatty acids must be re-esterified by glyceroneogenesis. Thiazolidinedione is a substance that only affects glyceroneogenesis in adipose tissue, increasing transcription of PEPC-K and eventually inducing glyceroneogenesis.

See also
Gluconeogenesis
Glycolysis
TCA cycle
Norepinephrine
Glucocorticoid

References

Metabolic pathways